Señor Blues is an album by American trombonist Urbie Green featuring performances with Grover Washington, Jr. and the David Matthews Big Band recorded in 1977 and released on the CTI label.

Reception
The Allmusic review stated "His first CTI set, The Fox, was quite dull, but this encore is on a much higher level. The trombonist displays his beautiful tone and impressive technique while joined by several horns and an expanded rhythm section .

Track listing
 "Captain Marvel" (Chick Corea) - 6:32
 "You Are So Beautiful" (Bruce Fisher, Billy Preston) - 2:58
 "Ysabel's Table Dance" (Charles Mingus) - 8:40
 "Señor Blues" (Horace Silver) - 7:45
 "I'm in You" (Peter Frampton) - 6:40
 "I Wish" (Stevie Wonder) - 4:22
Recorded at Electric Lady Studios in New York City in June 1977

Personnel
Urbie Green - trombone
Grover Washington, Jr. - tenor saxophone, soprano saxophone
David Matthews - electric piano, arranger
Burt Collins, Joe Shepley - trumpet, flugelhorn
Sam Burtis - trombone
Tony Price - tuba
Fred Griffin - French horn
Frank Vicari - tenor saxophone
David Tofani - soprano saxophone, flute
Kenny Berger - baritone saxophone, bass clarinet
John Scofield - electric guitar
Harvie Swartz - bass
Jim Madison - drums
Sue Evans - percussion

References

CTI Records albums
Urbie Green albums
1977 albums
Albums produced by Creed Taylor
Albums arranged by David Matthews (keyboardist)
Albums recorded at Electric Lady Studios